The Hive is a 2019 science fiction novel by American writers Orson Scott Card and Aaron Johnston, and the second book of the Second Formic Wars trilogy of novels in the Ender's Game series. It was released on June 11, 2019.

Plot
In 'The Swarm', the Formic's initial efforts to eradicate Earth life forms were beaten back by a coalition of corporate and international military forces, and the Chinese army, with notable efforts by Bingwen, Mazer Rackham, Victor Delgado and Lem Jukes. The devastation of China associated with this led to the reorganization of Earth's government for defense of the human species. In 'The Hive', the series' main characters face the forces of nationalism, tribalism, paranoia, egotism, jealousy, and self-aggrandizement that threaten to tear apart Earth's new defense forces from within. Meanwhile, they must battle the ever growing forces of the Formics and attempt to locate and destroy the Hive Queen.

Series
The book is the second of the Second Formic War trilogy by Card and Johnston. The titles for the first and third books are The Swarm and The Queens respectively.

Reception
As of November 2020, it had a rating of 4.07 out of 5 (1752 votes) on Goodreads.

See also
 List of Ender's Game characters
 List of works by Orson Scott Card

References

External links
 

2019 American novels
2019 science fiction novels
American science fiction novels
Novels by Orson Scott Card
Alien invasions in novels
Space opera novels
Ender's Game series books
American young adult novels
Fiction about near-Earth asteroids
Tor Books books